John Dowd may refer to:

 John M. Dowd (born 1941), American attorney
 John Dowd (politician) (born 1940), former opposition leader in New South Wales
 John Dowd (motocross) (born 1965), professional motocross racer
 John Albert Dowd (1876–1932), politician in Saskatchewan, Canada
 John H. Dowd (marketer, 1922–2004), advertising executive
 John Dowd (baseball) (1891–1981), American baseball player
 Johnny Dowd (born 1948), American country musician
 John F. Dowd (1894–1961), American politician, sheriff of Suffolk County, Massachusetts

See also
 Jon Dowd, fictional baseball player used as a replacement for Barry Bonds in MVP Baseball 2004 and 2005, due to Bonds leaving the MLB players accusation